Skovorodino is a town and the administrative center of Skovorodinsky District of Amur Oblast, Russia, located in the upper stream of the Bolshoy Never River  northwest of Blagoveshchensk, the administrative center of the oblast. Population:

Geography

History
It was founded in 1908 as the settlement of Zmeiny during the construction of the Trans-Siberian Railway. It was then renamed Never-1 after the nearby river. In 1911, it was once again renamed and became Rukhlovo. It was granted town status in 1927.

In 1938, it was renamed Skovorodino in honor of A. N. Skovorodin (1890–1920), chairman of a local soviet, who had been killed here during the Russian Civil War. There is a myth that it was named after a frying pan factory ordered by Stalin (in Russian, "frying pan" is "" (skovoroda)), which is not correct.

Administrative and municipal status
Within the framework of administrative divisions, Skovorodino serves as the administrative center of Skovorodinsky District. As an administrative division, it is, together with the settlement of Lesnoy, incorporated within Skovorodinsky District as Skovorodino Urban Settlement. As a municipal division, this administrative unit also has urban settlement status and is a part of Skovorodinsky Municipal District.

Economy
An oil pipeline is currently under construction from Tayshet north of Lake Baikal to Skovorodino; it is intended for oil to be transported from here by rail to the port of Nakhodka on the Pacific, as well as to China.  This is planned as the first section of a pipeline bringing natural gas directly to the Pacific ports, managed by Transneft. It was opened on December 27, 2009 by Prime Minister Vladimir Putin.

Climate
Skovorodino has a subarctic climate (Köppen climate classification Dwc). Precipitation is moderate and is much higher in summer than at other times of the year. Winters are generally dry.

References

Notes

Sources

External link

Cities and towns in Amur Oblast
Populated places established in 1908
1908 establishments in the Russian Empire